The women's 100 metres was the shortest of the four women's track races in the Athletics at the 1964 Summer Olympics program in Tokyo.  It was held on 15 October and 16 October 1964.  45 athletes from 27 nations entered, with 1 not starting in the first round.  The first two rounds were held on 15 October, with the semifinals and the final on 16 October.

Results

First round

The top five runners in each of the 6 heats advanced.

Heat 1

Heat 2

Heat 3

Heat 4

Heat 5

Heat 6

Second round

The top four runners in each of the four heats advanced to the semifinals.

Quarterfinal 1

† In the Second Round results as per the Official Olympic report, Avis McIntosh, of New Zealand, was erroneously mentioned as a Dutch athlete.

Quarterfinal 2

Quarterfinal 3

Quarterfinal 4

Semifinals

The top four runners in each of the two semifinals advanced to the final.

Semifinal 1

Semifinal 2

Final

References

 Official Report

Athletics at the 1964 Summer Olympics
100 metres at the Olympics
1964 in women's athletics
Women's events at the 1964 Summer Olympics